Rapariegos is a municipality located in the province of Segovia, Castile and León, Spain. According to the 2011 census (INE), the municipality has a population of 230 inhabitants.

In this municipality was born the historian Cándido María Ajo González y Saínz de Zúñiga.

References

Municipalities in the Province of Segovia